The Lower Saxon State Railway Office or NLEA was a central authority that managed the operation of many light railways (known as Kleinbahnen) in the North German state of  Lower Saxony. These were predominantly those railways which the state had a financial stake in.

History
As in most Prussian provinces, a large number of Kleinbahn railway lines appeared in the Province of Hanover following the passing of the  Prussian Kleinbahn law.

Railways managed by the NLEA 

 Ankum-Bersenbrücker Eisenbahn
 Bleckeder Kreisbahn
 Bremervörde-Osterholzer Eisenbahn GmbH
 Kleinbahn Buxtehude-Harsefeld GmbH
 Delmenhorst-Harpstedter Eisenbahn
 Gartetalbahn Göttingen Duderstadt
 Kleinbahn Farge-Wulsdorf GmbH
 Gittelde–Grund railway
 Kleinbahn Hoya-Syke-Asendorf GmbH
 Kleinbahn Lüchow-Schmarsau GmbH
 Kleinbahn Lüneburg-Soltau GmbH
 Kleinbahn Neuhaus-Brahlstorf GmbH
 Kleinbahn Soltau-Neuenkirchen GmbH
 Kleinbahn Winsen-Evendorf-Hützel GmbH
 Kleinbahn Winsen-Niedermarschacht GmbH
 Kreisbahn Emden-Pewsum-Greetsiel 
 Kreisbahn Leer-Aurich-Wittmund
 St. Andreasberger Kleinbahn GmbH
 Steinhuder Meer-Bahn GmbH
 Verden-Walsroder Eisenbahn
 Wilstedt-Zeven-Tostedter Eisenbahn

Sources 
 
 

Defunct railway companies of Germany
Light Railway Office